Trichomycterus maracaiboensis is a species of pencil catfish endemic to Venezuela, where it occurs in the San Juan river, a tributary to the Motatán river in the Lake Maracaibo basin.

References

maracaiboensis
Fish of South America
Fish of Venezuela
Endemic fauna of Venezuela
Taxa named by Leonard Peter Schultz
Fish described in 1944